Antimima argentea is a species of plant in the family Aizoaceae. It is endemic to Namibia.  Its natural habitat is subtropical or tropical dry shrubland.

References

Flora of Namibia
argentea
Least concern plants
Taxonomy articles created by Polbot
Plants described in 1998
Taxa named by Louisa Bolus
Taxa named by Heidrun Hartmann